Cassinetta di Lugagnano is a comune (municipality) in the Metropolitan City of Milan in the Italian region Lombardy, about  west of Milan. It borders the municipalities of Corbetta, Robecco sul Naviglio, Albairate and Abbiategrasso.

References

External links
 Official website

Cities and towns in Lombardy